The 26th New York Infantry Regiment, the "2nd Oneida Regiment", was an infantry regiment that served in the Union Army during the American Civil War.

Service
The 26th New York was organized in Elmira, New York, under command of Colonel William H. Christian and was mustered in for a two-year enlistment on May 21, 1861.

The regiment was mustered out of service on May 28, 1863, and those men who had signed three year enlistments or who re-enlisted were transferred to the 97th New York.

Total strength and casualties
The regiment suffered 5 officers and 101 enlisted men who were killed in action or mortally wounded and 42 enlisted men who died of disease, for a total of 148 fatalities.

See also
List of New York Civil War regiments

Notes

References
Taylor, Paul. Glory Was Not Their Companion: The Twenty-Sixth New York Volunteer Infantry in the Civil War. Jefferson, N.C.: McFarland Publishers, 2005.

Taylor, Paul, editor. "Give My Love to All Our Folks:" Civil War and Post-War Letters of Clinton DeWitt Staring and Charles E. Staring. Mancelona, Mi.: Deep Wood Press, 2007. C. DeWitt Staring served in the 26th NYSV.

External links
New York State Military Museum and Veterans Research Center: History, photographs, table of battles and casualties, and historical sketch for the 26th New York Infantry Regiment
The Civil War Archive

Infantry 026
1861 establishments in New York (state)
Military units and formations established in 1861
Military units and formations disestablished in 1863
1863 disestablishments in New York (state)